The 1974 ARFU Asian Rugby Championship was the 4th edition  of the tournament, and was played in Colombo. The 8 teams were divided into two pools, with the final consisting of the winning teams. Japan won the tournament.

Tournament

Pool A 

 Results
 Nov 18
 Nov 20
 Nov 22

Pool B 

 Results
 Sri Lanka
 Malaysia
 Laos
 Singapore

Finals

Third Place Final

First Place Final

 Results

Final standings

References

External links 
 Rugby Football 24巻

1974
1974 rugby union tournaments for national teams
1974–75 in Japanese rugby union
rugby union
International rugby union competitions hosted by Sri Lanka